Matt Sosnick is a former San Francisco-based sports agent. He attended Burlingame High School and the University of Southern California. His business partners are Paul Cobbe and Adam Karon. Their client list includes, or included at one time, Major League Baseball All-Star and 2003 Rookie of the Year Dontrelle Willis; All-Stars Josh Johnson, Jay Bruce, and Matt Moore; Ricky Nolasco; Josh Hamilton; Freddy Sanchez; Josh Willingham; and Ryan Doumit.

Sosnick addressed the 2007 national convention of the Society for American Baseball Research in addition to many other appearances and lecture series.

Sosnick was named one of Forbes magazine's five most influential young people in baseball in June 2008.

His close relationship with star pitcher Dontrelle Willis helped his agency grow, as did being the subject of ESPN's Jerry Crasnick's book License to Deal. At an earlier point in his career, Willis got Sosnick's company logo tattooed onto his pitching arm as a sign of his loyalty to Sosnick Cobbe Sports. Kyle Blanks of the Rangers, Jason Pridie of the Athletics, and retired RHP Zach Simons also have the Sosnick Cobbe logo tattooed on their arm.

As of 2015, Sosnick represents more than 40 Major League players, along with Randy Messenger, Wily Mo Pena, Aaron Poreda, and Kris Johnson in Japan, as well as Eric Thames, Eric Hacker, Jim Adduci, and Merrill Kelly in Korea.

In January 2013, Sosnick was inducted into the Jewish Sports Hall of Fame along with NBA coaches Herb and Larry Brown and sportswriter Art Spander.

In October 2019, Sosnick was arrested twice at his home in deluxe Blackhawk Estates in Danville, CA, once for grabbing his wife Erica in front of their 9-year-old daughter (Assault, Domestic Violence, Child Endangerment) and again days later for violation of a new Emergency Restraining Order issued by a Contra Costa CA Superior Court Judge. He also later threatened to kill himself. Erica has filed for divorce.  (SF Chronicle, LA Times, TMZ Sports, The Bleacher Report, 10/19/19).  All charges were dropped and Sosnick has custody of the children.

On November 8, 2019, SCK Sports partner Adam Karon announced that founding partner & licensed MLB agent Matt Sosnick is no longer affiliated with their organization (MLB Trade Rumors Newsletter & SCK Sports, 11/8/19).

References

External links
 Sosnick Cobbe & Karon website
 Interview with Matt Sosnick
 An interview with Matt Sosnick
 Golden Sombrero interview with Matt Sosnick

(SF Chronicle, LA Times, TMZ Sports, The Bleacher Report, 10/19/19).

(MLB Trade Rumors Newsletter & SCK Sports, 11/8/19).

American Jews
American sports agents
Living people
Year of birth missing (living people)